Janet McTeer  (born 5 August 1961) is an English actress. She began her career training at the Royal Academy of Dramatic Art before earning acclaim for playing diverse roles on stage and screen in both period pieces and modern dramas. She's received numerous accolades including a Tony Award, a Olivier Award, a Golden Globe Award, and nominations for an Academy Award and Primetime Emmy Award. In 2008 she was appointed as an Officer of the Order of the British Empire (OBE) from Queen Elizabeth II for her services to drama.

McTeer made her professional stage debut in 1984, and was nominated for the 1986 Olivier Award for Best Newcomer for The Grace of Mary Traverse. She received the Laurence Olivier Award for Best Actress, and the Tony Award for Best Actress in a Play for her performance in A Doll's House in 1997. For her roles on Broadway, she received two other nominations for Mary Stuart in 2009 and Bernhardt/Hamlet in 2019.

McTeer has also gained acclaim for her film roles, having received two Academy Award nominations, one for Best Actress for Tumbleweeds in 1997, and the other for Best Supporting Actress for Albert Nobbs in 2011. Other roles include Wuthering Heights (1992), Carrington (1995), Velvet Goldmine (1998), Songcatcher (2000), As You Like It (2006), The Divergent Series (2015–2016), and The Menu (2022). 

On television, she starred in the title role of Lynda La Plante's The Governor (1995–1996), and received a Primetime Emmy Award nomination for her portrayal of Clementine Churchill in the HBO film Into the Storm (2009). She's also known for her roles in Damages (2012), The White Queen (2013), The Honourable Woman (2014), Jessica Jones (2018), Sorry for Your Loss (2018-2019), and Ozark (2018-2020).

Early life
McTeer was born in Wallsend, Newcastle upon Tyne, England, and spent her childhood in York. She attended the now defunct Queen Anne Grammar School for Girls, and worked at the Old Starre Inn, at York Minster and at the city's Theatre Royal. She performed locally with the Rowntree Players at Joseph Rowntree Theatre, then trained at the Royal Academy of Dramatic Art, beginning a successful theatrical career with the Royal Exchange Theatre after graduating.

Career

Early roles 
McTeer's television work includes the BBC production Portrait of a Marriage, an adaptation of Nigel Nicolson's biography of the same name in which she played Vita Sackville-West, and the popular ITV series The Governor written by Lynda La Plante. She made her screen debut in Half Moon Street, a 1986 film based on a novel by Paul Theroux. In 1991, she appeared in Catherine Cookson's The Black Velvet Gown, with Bob Peck and Geraldine Somerville; this won the International Emmy award for best drama. She appeared in the 1992 film version of Wuthering Heights (co-starring Juliette Binoche and Ralph Fiennes) and the 1995 film Carrington (which starred Emma Thompson and Jonathan Pryce) as Vanessa Bell.

In 1996, McTeer garnered critical acclaim – and both the Laurence Olivier Theatre Award and Critics' Circle Theatre Award – for her performance as Nora in a West End production of Henrik Ibsen's A Doll's House. The following year, the production transferred to Broadway, and McTeer received a Tony Award, a Theatre World Award, and the Drama Desk Award for Best Actress in a Play.

During the show's run, McTeer was interviewed by Charlie Rose on his PBS talk show, where she was seen by American filmmaker Gavin O'Connor, who, at the time, was working on a screenplay about a single mother's cross-country wanderings with her pre-teenage daughter. He was determined that she star in the film. When prospective backers balked at her relative anonymity in the US, he produced the film himself. Tumbleweeds proved to be a 1999 Sundance Film Festival favourite, and McTeer's performance won her a Golden Globe as Best Actress and Academy Award and Screen Actors Guild nominations in the same category.

2000s 
McTeer's screen credits include Songcatcher (with Aidan Quinn), Waking the Dead (with Billy Crudup and Jennifer Connelly), the dogme film The King Is Alive (with Jennifer Jason Leigh), The Intended (with Brenda Fricker and Olympia Dukakis), and Tideland, written and directed by Terry Gilliam. She also starred in the dramatisation of Mary Webb's Precious Bane. She has appeared in such British television serials as The Amazing Mrs Pritchard, Hunter, and Agatha Christie's Marple (episode: "The Murder at the Vicarage").

McTeer played Mary, Queen of Scots in Mary Stuart, a play by Friedrich Schiller in a new version by Peter Oswald, directed by Phyllida Lloyd. She acted opposite Harriet Walter as Queen Elizabeth I in London's West End in 2005, a role she reprised in the 2009 Broadway transfer. McTeer received a Tony Award nomination for her role in Mary Stuart, and won the Drama Desk Award for Outstanding Actress in a Play.

In 2008, she starred in God of Carnage in the West End alongside Tamsin Greig, Ken Stott and Ralph Fiennes, at the Gielgud Theatre. She reprised her role on Broadway opposite Jeff Daniels from March to June 2010.

In 2009, she portrayed Clementine Churchill in the HBO feature Into the Storm about Sir Winston Churchill's years as Britain's leader during World War II.

2010s 
In 2011, McTeer starred alongside Glenn Close in Albert Nobbs and with Daniel Radcliffe and Ciarán Hinds in The Woman in Black (based on the 1983 novel of the same name). Her role as Hubert Page in Albert Nobbs won McTeer critical acclaim and numerous award nominations, including an Academy Award nomination for Best Supporting Actress. It was announced in November 2011 that McTeer had joined the cast of Damages (in the character of Kate Franklin) for its fifth and final season, reuniting her with her Albert Nobbs co-star Glenn Close. This was her first American television series. She played American novelist Mary McCarthy in Margarethe von Trotta's film Hannah Arendt.

In 2013 McTeer was cast as Jacquetta of Luxembourg, the mother of the title character in The White Queen, a British television drama series based on Philippa Gregory's best-selling historical novel series The Cousins' War. Her performance was applauded, with Sam Wollaston of The Guardian suggesting she stole the show. In December 2013, McTeer was nominated for a Golden Globe for Best Supporting Actress for her role as Jacquetta.

On 29 July 2013, it was announced that McTeer had joined the cast of The Honourable Woman, a BBC spy-thriller miniseries starring Maggie Gyllenhaal. In 2015, McTeer starred as Commander Kim Guziewicz in CBS comedy-drama Battle Creek, and filmed Exception based on The Kaiser's Last Kiss (in which she was due to portray Princess Hermine Reuss of Greiz), set for a 2016 release.

In 2016, McTeer played Petruchio in the New York Public Theater Shakespeare in the Park all-female production of The Taming of the Shrew, directed again by Phyllida Lloyd. She co-starred alongside Liev Schreiber in Les Liaisons Dangereuses on Broadway, with McTeer cast as Marquise de Merteuil. The play ran from October 2016 to January 2017.

In 2018, she played Alisa Jones in the Marvel Television and Netflix production Jessica Jones. In September 2018, she took on the role of Sarah Bernhardt in Theresa Rebeck's Broadway play Bernhardt/Hamlet. She was nominated for the 2019 Tony Award for Best Performance by an Actress in a Leading Role in a Play.

McTeer portrayed cartel attorney Helen Pierce on the Netflix crime drama Ozark.

Honours
McTeer was appointed an Officer of the Order of the British Empire (OBE) in the 2008 Queen's Birthday Honours.

Personal life 
McTeer has been married to poet and fashion consultant Joseph Coleman since 2010. They reside in Maine.

Filmography

Film

Television

Theatre

Video games

Accolades

References

External links
 
 
 1999 interview re: Tumbleweeds
 1999 Salon interview re: Tumbleweeds
 2007 Guardian interview
 God of Carnage review
 Red Carpet Interview on Ms. Fabulous

1961 births
Alumni of RADA
Audiobook narrators
Best Musical or Comedy Actress Golden Globe (film) winners
Drama Desk Award winners
English film actresses
English radio actresses
English stage actresses
English television actresses
English voice actresses
Laurence Olivier Award winners
Living people
Officers of the Order of the British Empire
Actresses from Newcastle upon Tyne
Royal Shakespeare Company members
English Shakespearean actresses
Tony Award winners
20th-century English actresses
21st-century English actresses
Actresses from Northumberland
Actresses from York
Theatre World Award winners